BNS Shaheed Daulat is a  inshore patrol vessel of the Bangladesh Navy. She was launched on 14 February 2022.

Career
The ship was ordered on 20 May 2019. The contract was awarded to Khulna Shipyard in Khulna, Bangladesh, where the keel was laid on 2 December 2019. The ship was launched on 14 February 2022.

Design
The patrol vessel has a displacement of 350 tonnes. The ship's complement is 45 persons and can carry out missions lasting up to seven days at a time.

Armament
The ship is equipped with one Bofors 40 mm L/60 cannon and a pair of 12.7mm CIS 50MGs. Shaheed Daulat can also carry naval mines and MANPADS.

See also
List of active ships of the Bangladesh Navy

References

Ships of the Bangladesh Navy
Patrol vessels of the Bangladesh Navy
Padma-class Patrol Vessel
2022 ships
Ships built at Khulna Shipyard